Horror Epics is the fourth studio album by Scottish punk rock band The Exploited, released in 1985. It was reissued on Captain Oi! Records in 2004.

Track listing
All tracks written by Wattie Buchan and Wayne Tyas, unless otherwise stated

Side one
"Horror Epics" –  5:04
"Don't Forget the Chaos" (Buchan) –  3:05
"Law and Order" –  2:52
"I Hate You" (Buchan) –  1:38
"No More Idols" –  4:55
"Maggie" –  2:35
Side two
"Dangerous Visions" –  3:35
"Down Below" –  4:18
"Treat You Like Shit" –  3:38
"Forty Odd Years Ago" –  2:56
"My Life" –  5:39

CD reissue bonus tracks
"Race Against Time" - 4:21
"Propaganda" - 2:26

Personnel
The Exploited
Wattie Buchan – vocals
Karl Morris- guitar
Wayne Tyas – bass
Wullie Buchan – drums

Additional personnel
Phil Chilton – producer
John Ravenhall – engineer
Scott Billet – photographist
Brian Burrows – designer
Mark Brennan – liner notes

References

External links
 Credits and info

1985 albums
The Exploited albums
Captain Oi! Records albums
Taang! Records albums